The  Down House, located on Louisiana Highway 154 near Gibsland in Bienville Parish, Louisiana, is a Greek Revival-style house built in 1852–53.  It was listed on the National Register of Historic Places in 1980.

It is a five-bay house with a front gallery.  Its NRHP nomination states its significance: "This building, because of its cornices over the fenestration and its full molded Doric pillars, is the most classically correct and fully developed example of a Greek Revival residence in the area."

References

Houses on the National Register of Historic Places in Louisiana
Greek Revival architecture in Louisiana
Houses completed in 1852
Bienville Parish, Louisiana